Abū Muḥammad ʿIzz al-Dīn ʿAbd al-ʿAzīz bin ʿAbd al-Salām bin Abī al-Qāsim bin Ḥasan al-Sulamī al-Shāfiʿī (‎; 577 AH - 660 AH / 1262 CE), also known by his titles, Sultan al-'Ulama/ Sulthanul Ulama, Abu Muhammad al-Sulami, was a famous mujtahid, Ash'ari theologian, jurist and the leading Shafi'i authority of his generation. He was described by Al-Dhahabi as someone who attained the rank of ijtihad, with asceticism and piety and the command of virtue and forbidding of what is evil and solidity in religion. He was described by Ibn al-Imad al-Hanbali as the sheikh of Islam, the imam of the scholar, the lone of his era, the authority of scholars, who excelled in jurisprudence, origins and the Arabic language, and reached the rank of ijtihad, and received students who traveled to him from all over the country.

Al-Izz Bin Abdul Salam was born in Damascus in 577 AH (1181 AD), where he grew up. He studied the sciences of the Sharia and the Arabic language, and he preached at the Umayyad Mosque and taught in the corner of Al-Ghazali. He was famous for his knowledge until he reached out to students from the country, which led to his incarceration. He then migrated to Egypt, where he was appointed a judge, and he taught and advised, and was appointed to preach at the Mosque of Amr Ibn Al-As, and incited people to fight the Mongols and the Crusaders, and participated in jihad himself. He died in Cairo in the year 660 AH (1262 AD).

Birth and education 

Ibn 'Abd al-Salam was born in Damascus in 577 AH. He received his education in Damascus by such scholars as Ibn Asakir and Jamal al-Din al-Harastani in Sacred law, Sayf al-Din al-Amidi in usul al-Fiqh and theology, and Tasawwuf with Suhrawardi and Abul Hasan al-Shadhili.

Imprisonment
In Damascus, as sermon giver (khatib) of the Umayyad mosque, he openly defied what he considered to be unsanctioned customs followed by the other sermon givers: he refused to wear black, refused to say his sermons in rhymed prose (saj) and refused to praise the princes. When the ruler As-Salih Ismail made capitulatory concessions to Theobald during the Barons' Crusade, Ibn 'Abd al-Salam condemned him from the pulpit and omitted mentioning him in the post-sermon prayer. He was consequently jailed and upon release emigrated to Egypt.

Egypt
Having left Damascus, Ibn 'Abd al-Salam settled in Cairo where he was appointed chief judge and Imam of the Friday prayer, gaining such public influence that he could (and did) command the right and forbid the wrong with the force of the law.

Ibn 'Abd al-Salam later resigned from the judiciary and undertook a career as a teacher of Shafi'i law at the Salihiyya, a college founded in the heart of Cairo by al-Malik al-Salih which had then barely been completed and which was, in Egypt, the first establishment providing instruction in the four rites. The biographers indicate that he was the first to teach 
Qur'anic commentary in Egypt.

Ibn 'Abd al-Salam's exploits eventually earned him the title Sultan al-'Ulema (Sultan of the scholars).

Name and Lineage
According to the consensus of scholars and the consensus of the approved sources, His name was Abdul Aziz bin Abdul Salam bin Abi Al-Qasim bin Hassan bin Muhammad bin Mudhahb.

Works
He produced a number of brilliant works in Shafi'i jurisprudence, Qur'anic jurisprudence tafsir, methodological fundamentals in Sacred Law, formal legal opinion, government and Sufism though his main and enduring contribution was his masterpiece on Islamic legal principles . Some of his more popular works are on:

Qur'aan
Tafsir al-Qur'an al-Azim,
Mukhtasar al-Nukat wa'l 'Uyun lil Imam al-Mawardi,
Al-Isharah ila al-Ijaz,
Fawa'id fi Mushkil al-Qur'an
Amali

Hadith / Sirah
Mukhtasar Sahih Muslim,
Bidayat al-Sul fi Tafdhil al-Rasul; available in its translated form as The Beginning of The Quest of the High Esteem of the Messenger
Targhib Ahl al-Islam fi Sakni al-Sham,

Aqeedah
Al-Mulhat fi I'tiqad Ahl al-Haqq or by its other title; al-Radd 'ala al-Mubtadi'ah wa'l Hashawiyah; transmitted by his son 'Abd al-Latif.
Al-Farq bayn al-Iman wa'l Islam or Ma'na al-Iman wa'l Islam,
Al-Anwa' fi 'ilm al-Tawhid,
Bayan Ahwal al-Nas yawm al-Qiyamah,

Tasawwuf / Raqa'iq
,
Al-Fitan wa'l Balaya wa'l Mihan,
Mukhtasar Ra'ayah al-Muhasibi or Maqasid al-Ri'ayah li Huquqillah,

Usool
Qawa'id al-Kubra or by its full title; Qawa'id al-Ahkam fi Masalih al-Anam. Its popular commentary is available by Imam al-Qarafi who was one of his students.
Al-Qawa'id al-Sughra, or al-Fawa'id fi Mukhtasar al-Qawa'id; is an abridgement of the above title.
Al-Imam fi Bayan Adillat al-Ahkam, or ad-Dala'il al-Muta'aliqah bi'l Mala'ikah wa'l Nabiyin,

Fiqh
Al-Ghayah fi Ikhtisar al-Nihayah; is an abridgement of Nihayat al-Matlab fi Dirayat al-Madhab of imam al-Haramayn al-Juwayni.
Al-Jam' bayaan al-Hawi wa'l Nihayah; not known to have finished it.
Al-Fatawa al-Misriyyah,
Al-Fatawa al-Musiliyyah,
At-Targhib 'an Salat al-Ragha'ib, or by another title; al-Targhib 'an Salat al-Ragha'ib al-Mawdu'ah wa bayan ma fiha min Mukhalafat al-Sunan al-Mashru'ah, or by another title; Risalat fi Dhamm Salat al-Ragha'ib.
Risalat fi Radd Jawaz Salat al-Ragha'ib or by the title of Risalat fi Tafnid Radd Ibn al-Salah,
Maqasid al-Sawm,
Manasik al-Hajj,
Maqasid al-Salah,
Ahkam al-Jihad wa Fadha'ilihi,

Reception
Zaki al-Din al-Mundhiri, the Shafi'i jurist, hadith expert and author stated that, "We used to give legal opinions before shaykh 'Izz al-Din arrived; now that he is among us we no longer do so."

Qarafi describes Ibn 'Abd al-Salam as a "staunch defender of the sunna who had no fear of those in power."

A number of sources report that Ibn 'Abd al-Salam reached the level of ijtihad transcending the Shafi'i madhab altogether.

Death
He died in Cairo in 660 AH.

See also 
 List of Ash'aris and Maturidis

References

Asharis
Shafi'is
Sunni Muslim scholars of Islam
Supporters of Ibn Arabi
Mujaddid
1180s births
1262 deaths
13th-century jurists
13th-century Arabs
12th-century Arabs
Muslim scholars persecuted by Hanbalis